Lal Chand Malhi is a Pakistani politician who had been a member of the National Assembly of Pakistan, from August 2018 till January 2023. Previously he was a member of the National Assembly from 2008 to May 2018.

Early life and education
He was born on 3 February 1973.

He received his education from Umerkot and Hyderabad. He graduated from the University of Sindh.

Political career
He was elected to the National Assembly of Pakistan on a seat reserved for minorities as a candidate of Pakistan Peoples Party (PPP) in the 2008 Pakistani general election.

He was re-elected to the National Assembly as a candidate of Pakistan Tehreek-e-Insaf (PTI) on a seat reserved for minorities in the 2013 Pakistani general election.

He was re-elected to the National Assembly as a candidate of PTI on a reserved seat for minorities in 2018 Pakistani general election.

On 27 September 2018, Prime Minister Imran Khan appointed him as Federal Parliamentary Secretary for human rights. He has spoken in support of the Shri Krishna Mandir temple in Islamabad. He condemned the 2020 Karak temple attack, where a mob of 1,500 local Muslims led by a local Islamic cleric and the supporters of  Jamiat Ulema-e-Islam party attacked and burnt the temple.

References

Living people
Pakistani MNAs 2013–2018
Pakistani MNAs 2008–2013
Pakistani Hindus
Pakistan Tehreek-e-Insaf MNAs
1973 births
Pakistani MNAs 2018–2023